Attercliffe Road railway station is a former railway station in Sheffield, South Yorkshire, England.

The station served the communities of Attercliffe, Burngreave and workers in the Don Valley and was situated on the Midland Main Line near Attercliffe Road, lying between Sheffield railway station and Brightside railway station.

History

The station was opened at the same time as the main line from Chesterfield was opened in 1870 and had two platforms. This new station of 1870 was designed by the company architect John Holloway Sanders. The station was positioned above Effingham Street, although access was from a gated path from Leveson Street; an underpass led to an inclined bridge on to the Down platforms.

Opened by the Midland Railway, it became part of the London Midland and Scottish Railway  during the Grouping of 1923. The station then passed on to the London Midland Region of British Railways upon nationalisation in 1948.

When sectorisation was introduced in the 1980s, the station was served by Regional Railways in co-operation with the South Yorkshire Passenger Transport Executive until the privatisation of British Rail.

The decline of Sheffield's steel industry in the later half of the 20th century gradually reduced the passenger usage and made the station less and less needed. By the 1980s only certain morning and evening peak trains called at the station, as stopping trains there exacerbated capacity problems in the major bottleneck north of Sheffield Midland.  By the early 1990s this lack of trains had caused the station's patronage to dwindle to a level at which closure was easily justified, again with line capacity constraints being quoted as the reason, with the end coming in 1995.

Little is left of the station but the platforms which can be seen from moving trains. The underpass is blocked by overgrown vegetation although the gated entrance can still be seen from Leveson Street just by the bridge over the River Don.

References

Notes

Sources
 
 
 
 Station on navigable O.S. map The station is the minor one to the north of the two main Sheffield stations

External links
Photo of station in 1983 looking towards Sheffield

Attercliffe
Disused railway stations in Sheffield
Former Midland Railway stations
Railway stations in Great Britain opened in 1870
Railway stations in Great Britain closed in 1995